German School Abuja is a German international school located on the grounds of the Julius Berger Life Camp in Gwarinpa, Abuja, Nigeria. Its classes go from kindergarten to class 5. The construction company Julius Berger Nigeria PLC operates the school.

Like many German international schools, the Abuja school is smaller than other international schools in the area because it targets German citizens and native speakers of German, and it only accepts small numbers of students who do not natively speak German. It was scheduled to begin offering an English language stream in 2017.

References

External links

 German School Abuja

Abuja
International schools in Abuja